The Communist Party of Bangladesh (Marxist–Leninist) is a political party in Bangladesh led by Ajoy Dutta. Dutta's BSD (ML) is an underground party.

The party publishes the newspaper Porjash and is affiliated with the Revolutionary Internationalist Movement and CCOMPOSA.

References 

Communist parties in Bangladesh
Coordination Committee of Maoist Parties and Organisations of South Asia
Maoist organisations in Bangladesh